The term subvariant has at least two applications. 

 A mathematical term in invariant theory associated with the concept perpetuant.
 In microbiology and virology, a subvariant is a subtype of a known variant of a microorganism.